Kneebody is an American band formed in 2001, consisting of Adam Benjamin on keyboards, Shane Endsley on trumpet, Ben Wendel on tenor saxophone, and Nate Wood on bass guitar and drums.

History
Ben Wendel, Shane Endsley, Adam Benjamin, and Kaveh Rastegar met in the late 1990s as students at the Eastman School of Music. Benjamin later transferred to CalArts, where he met Nate Wood. After graduating Eastman, Wendel and Rastegar moved to Los Angeles, and the band got its start at the Temple Bar and The Vic in Santa Monica, California, where they played a weekly residency. The name of the band was a nonsense word invented by Wendel's girlfriend, so that the band had no clear leader and no clear musical connotations.

In 2005, the band's self-titled debut album was released on Dave Douglas' Greenleaf Music label. In 2007, they released their next album, Low Electrical Worker, to further critical acclaim (Joshua Redman declared it one of his favorite albums of 2007).

In February 2019, it was announced that Rastegar would be leaving the group to focus on other projects, with Wood taking on bass along with playing drums.

In May 2019 the band released the EP By Fire, consisting of covers and guest-vocalists via the label Edition Records.

Style and influences
According to Nate Chinen, writing in The New York Times, Kneebody is "a resolutely un-pindownable band" acclaimed for their eclectic style, which "uses a common jazz instrumentation to make a somewhat less common amalgam of urban-signifying genres, from electro-pop to punk-rock to hip-hop."

Members

Current 
Adam Benjamin - keyboards
Shane Endsley - trumpet
Ben Wendel - tenor sax
Nate Wood - bass, drums

Former 
 Kaveh Rastegar - bass

Discography

Studio albums
 Kneebody (Greeanleaf, 2005)
 Low Electrical Worker (Colortone, 2007)
 Twelve Songs by Charles Ives with Theo Bleckmann (Winter & Winter, 2008) 
 You Can Have Your Moment (Winter & Winter, 2010)
 The Line (Concord, 2013)
 Kneedelus  with Daedelus (Brainfeeder, 2015)
 Anti-Hero (Motema, 2017)
 Chapters (Edition, 2019)

Live albums
 Kneebody Live: Volume One (2007)
 Kneebody Live: Volume Two: Live in Italy (2009)
 Kneebody Live: Volume Three: Live in Paris (2011)
 Kneebody Live Fall Tour 2003 (2021)
 Live at Le Crescent (Edition 2022)

EPs
 By Fire (2019)

References

Further reading

External links
 
 Kneebody at All About Jazz
 
 

American jazz ensembles
Jazz fusion ensembles
Musical quintets
Motéma Music artists
Edition Records artists
Winter & Winter Records artists
Brainfeeder artists